The ISO61 (IsrA) RNA is a bacterial non-coding RNA  that is found between the abgR and ydaL genes in Escherichia coli and Shigella flexneri. It was discovered using a computational screen of the E. coli genome. Subsequent characterisation of ISO61 region has revealed that the reverse strand is actually a CsrA binding ncRNA called McaS and that it has a role in biofilm formation control. Furthermore, it has been shown that McaS(IsrA) exists as ribonucleoprotein particles (sRNPs), which involve a defined set of proteins including Hfq, S1, CsrA, ProQ and PNPase.

See also 
IS102 RNA
IS128 RNA

References

External links 
 

Non-coding RNA